Novorossiysk is a city in Krasnodar Krai, Russia. It is one of the largest ports on the Black Sea. It is one of the few cities honored with the title of the Hero City. Population:

History

In antiquity, the shores of the Tsemes Bay were the site of Bata, an ancient Greek colony that specialized in the grain trade. It is mentioned in the works of Strabo and Ptolemy, among others.

Following brief periods of Roman and Khazar control, from the 9th century onwards, the area was part of the Byzantine θέμα Χερσῶνος Thema Khersonos (Province of Cherson).

During the 11th century, the area was overrun and controlled by nomads from the Eurasian steppe, led by the Cumans. Later that century, the Byzantine emperor Ἀλέξιος Κομνηνός Alexios I Komnenos (r. 1081–1118) was approached by Anglo-Saxon refugees, who had left England following the Norman conquest. Alexios offered land to these refugees in Thema Khersonos if they could recapture it from the nomads and there is contemporaneous evidence that a Byzantine-English colony was subsequently founded. For example, medieval nautical charts mention place names on the Kuban coast with possible English origins, including a port (located within or near the future site of Novorossiysk) known as Susaco (or Susacho) – a name that may have been derived from Sussex. (The same maps also show, north-west of Susaco, a river Londia, which may derive its name from London.)

In the 15th century, Genoese merchants from the Ghisolfi family maintained a trade outpost in the area. A 2007 archaeological investigation of related sites discovered some interesting items.

From 1722, the bay was controlled by an Ottoman fortress (qale) named Sujuk (also transliterated Sudzhuk, Sudschuk and Soğucak). This name may be derived from Susaco (see above) and, as late as 1769, the area was sometimes named in European maps as Suzako.

The coastline was ceded to Russia in 1829 as a result of the Russo-Turkish War. After this, admirals Mikhail Lazarev and Nikolay Raevsky founded an eastern base for the Black Sea Fleet on the shore in 1838. Named after the province of Novorossiya, the port formed a vital link in the chain of forts known as the Black Sea Coastal Line, which stretched south to Sochi.

During the rest of the 19th century, Novorossiysk developed rapidly. It was granted city status in 1866 and became the capital of the Novorossiysk Okrug and Black Sea Governorate, the smallest in the Russian Empire, in 1896. In December 1905, the city was the seat of the short-lived Novorossiysk Republic. From 26 August 1918 until 27 March 1920, the city was used as the principal center of Denikin's White Army during the Russian Civil War. Denikin's South Russian Government was moved to Crimea and many Whites escaped from Novorossiysk to Constantinople during the Evacuation of Novorossiysk (1920), with the help of Allied warships.

During World War II, most of the city was occupied by the German and Romanian Armies on 10 September 1942. A small unit of Soviet sailors defended one part of the city, known as Malaya Zemlya, for 225 days beginning on 4 February 1943, and the town was liberated by the Red Army on September 16, 1943. The heroic defense of the port by the sailors allowed the Soviets to retain possession of the city's bay, which prevented the Axis from using the port for supply shipments. Novorossiysk was awarded the title Hero City in 1973.

In 1960, the town was commemorated in Dmitri Shostakovich's work Novorossiysk Chimes, the Flame of Eternal Glory (Opus 111b).

In 2003, President Vladimir Putin signed a decree setting up a naval base for the Black Sea Fleet in Novorossiysk. Russia has allocated 12.3 billion rubles (about $480 million) for the construction of the new base between 2007 and 2012. The construction of other facilities and infrastructure at the base, including units for coastal troops, aviation and logistics, will continue beyond 2012. Russia planned to move the Black Sea Fleet with 80 warships and its headquarters from Sevastopol to Novorossiysk base in 2020.

The Russian lease on port facilities in Sevastopol, which, though the main base of Russia's Black Sea Fleet, was part of Ukraine, was set to expire in 2017. Ukraine was reported to be planning to not renew the lease; however, in April 2010 the Russian and Ukrainian presidents signed an agreement to extend the lease by twenty-five years, with an option of further extension of five years after the new term expires. However, in 2014, Crimea was occupied by the Russian Armed Forces during the 2014 Crimean crisis and as such the question of renewing the lease does not immediately arise while Crimea remains de facto part of the territory of the Russian Federation.

Administrative and municipal status
Within the framework of administrative divisions, it is, together with twenty-four rural localities, incorporated as the City of Novorossiysk—an administrative unit with the status equal to that of the districts. As a municipal division, the City of Novorossiysk is incorporated as Novorossiysk Urban Okrug.

Climate
Novorossiysk has a borderline humid subtropical (Cfa) and Mediterranean climate (Csa) in the Köppen climate classification. Since the driest month has  and may or may not happen consistently in the summer, the city can not be classified as solely humid subtropical or Mediterranean.

Economy
The city sprawls along the shore of the non-freezing Tsemess Bay, which has been recognized since antiquity as one of the superior bays of the Black Sea.

The Novorossiysk Commercial Sea Port–with the market capitalization of $1,110,000,000 and shares listed at Moscow Exchange and London Stock Exchange–serves Russian sea trade with regions of Asia, Middle East, Africa, Mediterranean, and South America. It is the busiest oil port in the Black Sea and the terminus of the pipeline from the Tengiz Field, developed by the Caspian Pipeline Consortium.

Novorossiysk is also an industrial city, dependent on steel, food processing, and the production of metal goods and other manufactures.  Extensive limestone quarries supply important cement factories in and around the city. The town is home to the Maritime State Academy and Novorossiysk Polytechnic Institute.

Transportation 

Novorossiysk is the biggest Russian seaport. In 2019 cargo turnover amounted to 142,5m tons In 2021 cargo turnover amounted to 105,2m tons

Novorossiysk is connected by rail and highways to the main industrial and population centres of Russia, Transcaucasia, and Central Asia. The public transportation within the city boundaries consists of city buses, trolleybuses, and marshrutkas (routed taxis).
However, with time, more and more people rely on automobiles as primary means of transportation.

Sports
The city association football team, FC Chernomorets Novorossiysk, plays in the Russian second Division.

Environment 
Novorossiysk is not a resort town, but Anapa to the north and Gelendzhik to the south are. There are several urban settlements under the jurisdiction of Novorossiysk. The most famous is Abrau-Dyurso, which consists of a townlet on the shore of Lake Abrau and a village on the coast of the Black Sea, connected by a winding mountain road.

The area of Novorossiysk is one of Russia's main wine-growing regions. The wineries of Abrau-Dyurso, established by Tsar Alexander III in 1870, produce table and sparkling wines for domestic consumption.

Buildings and structures

Novorossiysk TV Tower
Shopping Mall "Krasnaya Ploshchad"
"Lenin's" Amusement Park
Malaya Zemlya Memorial

Notable residents
Seitumer Emin (1921 – 2004), Crimean Tatar writer and civil rights activist
Ida Nudel (1931 – 2021), refusenik and Israeli activist
Eugene Kaspersky (born 1956), founder of Kaspersky Labs
Emir-Usein Kuku (born 1976), Crimean Tatar human rights defender

Twin towns and sister cities

Novorossiysk is twinned with:

References

Notes

Sources

External links
Official website of Novorossiysk 
Novorossiysk commercial sea port
Informational portal of city 
Our Novorossiysk 
Site of Novorossiysk City. Map of Novorossiysk  
Photos of Novorossiysk 
Novorossiysk Police Department 
Soviet topographic map 1:100,000

 
Cities and towns in Krasnodar Krai
Territories of the Republic of Genoa
Kuban Oblast
Black Sea Governorate
Populated coastal places in Russia
Port cities and towns in Russia
Populated places established in 1838
Port cities of the Black Sea
Russian and Soviet Navy bases
1838 establishments in the Russian Empire
Russo-Turkish War (1828–29)
Greek colonies on the Black Sea coast